When She Starts, Look Out is a 1926 German silent comedy film directed by Carl Froelich and starring Henny Porten, Bruno Kastner, and Curt Bois. It was shot at the EFA Studios in Berlin. The film's sets were designed by Franz Schroedter. It premiered the UFA-Palast am Zoo.

Cast

References

Bibliography

External links

1926 films
Films of the Weimar Republic
German silent feature films
Films directed by Carl Froelich
German comedy films
UFA GmbH films
German black-and-white films
1926 comedy films
Silent comedy films
Films shot at Halensee Studios
1920s German films
1920s German-language films